Gregor J. Bock (November 2, 1907 – October 17, 1991) was a member of the Wisconsin State Assembly.

Biography
Bock was born on November 2, 1907, in Muscoda, Wisconsin. He attended the University of Wisconsin–Madison. Bock later became Fire Chief of Highland, Wisconsin and Deputy Sheriff of Iowa County, Wisconsin. He was a member of the Knights of Columbus. He died on October 17, 1991.

Political career
Bock was elected to the Assembly in 1964 and re-elected in 1966 and 1968. Bock sought a fourth term in 1970, but was defeated by Phil Leyda in the party's nomination, and his seat ultimately went to the Democratic candidate, Joanne M. Duren. Previously, he was mayor of Highland and president of the Highland School Board from 1939 to 1943, and postmaster of Highland from 1941 to 1951. He was a Republican.

References

People from Muscoda, Wisconsin
People from Iowa County, Wisconsin
Republican Party members of the Wisconsin State Assembly
Mayors of places in Wisconsin
School board members in Wisconsin
Wisconsin postmasters
American fire chiefs
University of Wisconsin–Madison alumni
1907 births
1991 deaths
20th-century American politicians